Quad City DJ's is an American music group consisting of Jay Ski (Johnny McGowan), C.C. Lemonhead (Nathaniel Orange), and JeLana LaFleur who recorded the 1996 hit "C'mon N' Ride It (The Train)", a rap-remix of Barry White's 1974 "Theme from Together Brothers". They are best known for writing and performing the theme song to the 1996 animated basketball film Space Jam.

Ski and Lemonhead first partnered in 1988 in Jacksonville, Florida. They first were in a group known as Chill Deal. During this time they produced fellows acts Three Grand and Icey J, the latter being famous for the female answer rap to Rob Base's "It Takes Two" entitled "It Takes a Real Man". After Chill Deal dissolved, they reformed as 95 South to create the triple platinum hit "Whoot, There It Is". Their success led to work with Dis-n-Dat producing "Freak Me Baby" and 69 Boyz producing the double platinum single "Tootsee Roll".

In 1996 the two formed Quad City DJ's and produced the single "C'mon N' Ride It (The Train)". The song was very successful, peaking at #3 on the Billboard Hot 100 and was certified platinum. They then produced the following album Get On Up and Dance, featuring the hit single, which peaked at #31 on the Billboard Hot 200 and also was certified platinum. The album also included the minor hit "Summer Jam" which peaked at #27 on the Billboard Hot Rap Singles chart.

Later in 1996 the group contributed to the Space Jam soundtrack, including the theme song. The theme song got frequent showing on MTV and charted fairly well, peaking at #37 on the Billboard Hot 100.

The term "Quad" in the group's name is a local reference to bass.

The group currently consists of original member C.C. Lemonhead, with Tony WHOA! (Anthony Wallace II) and Tamara Wallace (formerly of the Funky Green Dogs).

Discography

Studio albums

Singles

References

See also
 Southern rap
 Miami bass

1988 establishments in Florida
1997 disestablishments in Florida
African-American musical groups
American musical duos
Miami bass groups
Musical groups established in 1988
Musical groups disestablished in 1997
Musical groups reestablished in 2012
Musical groups from Jacksonville, Florida
Southern hip hop groups